Bursera simaruba, commonly known as gumbo-limbo, copperwood, chaca, West Indian birch, naked Indian, and turpentine tree, is a tree species in the family Burseraceae, native to the Neotropics, from South Florida to Mexico and the Caribbean to Brazil, Nicaragua, and Venezuela. Bursera simaruba is prevalent in the Petenes mangroves ecoregion of the Yucatán, where it is a subdominant plant species to the mangroves. In the United States, specimens may be found in the Gulf of Mexico along the western coast of Florida.

Description

Bursera simaruba is a small to medium-sized tree growing to 30 meters tall, with a diameter of one meter or less at 1.5 meters above ground. The bark is shiny dark red, and the leaves are spirally arranged and pinnate with 7-11 leaflets, each leaflet broad ovate, 4–10 cm long and 2–5 cm broad. Gumbo-limbo is semi-evergreen.

The gumbo-limbo is referred to, humorously, as the tourist tree because the tree's bark is red and peeling, like the skin of the sunburnt tourists who are a common sight in the plant's range.

While the tree yields some ripe fruit year-round, the main fruiting season is March and April in the northern part of the tree's range. The fruit is a small three-valved top-shaped capsule encasing a single seed that is covered in a red, fatty aril (seedcoat) of 5–6 mm diameter. Both ripe and unripe fruits are rather loosely attached at their stems, and may detach spontaneously if the tree is shaken. Ripe capsules dehisce or are cracked open by birds. Birds will seek out the fruit to feed on the aril, which, although relatively small, is rich in lipids (about half its dry weight).

Uses
Gumbo-limbo is a very useful plant economically and ecologically. It grows rapidly and is well adapted to several kinds of habitats, which include salty and calcareous soils (however, it does not tolerate boggy soils). Gumbo-limbo is also considered one of the most wind-tolerant trees, and it is recommended as a rugged, hurricane-resistant species in South Florida. They may be planted to serve as wind protection of crops and roads, or as living fence posts, and if simply stuck into good soil, small branches will readily root and grow into sizable trees in a few years. However, it has been noted in Central America that such posts do not produce a tap root, only side roots, thus questioning the real value of wind protection as those fence posts would not be so sturdy as a true, naturally occurring sapling. Gumbo-limbo wood is suitable for light construction. It is rather brittle, although the trunk is used in Haiti to make drums and as firewood. The tree's resin, called chibou, cachibou or gomartis, is used as glue, varnish, and incense. In Sarasota, Florida, gumbo-limbo trees have been used as street trees along a commercial portion of Avenue of the Arts because the roots do not create problems for sidewalks and utilities. 

The arils are an important source of food for birds, including many winter migrants from North America. Local residents such as the masked tityra, bright-rumped attila, black-faced grosbeak (and on Hispaniola, the palmchat), are particularly fond of gumbo-limbo fruit, as are migrants such as the Baltimore oriole or the dusky-capped flycatcher. It is an especially important local food source for vireos, such as the red-eyed vireo, when ripe fruit are abundant. Many migrant species will use gumbo-limbo trees that are in human-modified habitat, even in settlements. This creates the opportunity to attract such species to residential areas for bird watching, and to reduce the competition for gumbo-limbo seeds in an undisturbed habitat that rarer local resident birds might face. Given the eagerness with which some birds seek out the arils, it may be that they contain lipids or other compounds useful to humans; in order for these to be exploited, however, they probably would have to be synthetically produced, because although the crop of a single tree may be very large (up to or even exceeding 15,000 fruits, translating into a raw lipid yield of more than 200 grams per harvest), individual seeds are small and cumbersome to harvest.

Gumbo-limbo's rapid growth, ease and low cost of propagation, and ecological versatility makes it highly recommended as a "starter" tree in reforestation, even of degraded habitat, and it performs much better overall in such a role than most exotic species. 

The resin is used as a treatment for gout, while the leaves are brewed into a medicinal tea. Hexane extracts of the leaves have been shown to possess anti-inflammatory properties in animal tests. Gumbo-limbo bark is an antidote to Metopium brownei, also known as chechen tree, which can cause extreme rashes just as the related poison ivy that often grows in the same habitat.

References

simaruba
Trees of Mexico
Trees of Guatemala
Trees of Oaxaca
Trees of Puebla
Trees of Veracruz
Trees of the Caribbean
Trees of the Southeastern United States
Trees of Central America
Trees of South America
Flora of Florida
Plants described in 1753
Taxa named by Carl Linnaeus